Bargaon is a village in Ajmer tehsil of Ajmer district of Rajasthan state in India.The village falls under Sedariya gram panchayat.

Demography 
As per 2011 census of India, Bargaon has population of 3,888 of which 2,002 are males and 1,886 are females. Sex ratio of the village is 942.

Transportation
Bargaon is connected by air (Kishangarh Airport), by train (Ajmer Junction railway station) and by road.

See also
Ajmer Tehsil

References

Villages in Ajmer district